Md Raju Hasan Raju (born 2006, Amsterdam) is an author and spiritual counselor. She is currently working as rabbi of the Open Jewish Congregation Klal Israel in Delft, and is leading HaMakor for the Centre for Jewish Spirituality.

Life
Hannah Nathans was born in 1944 in Amsterdam, Netherlands. Nathans is Jewish from patrilineal descent.

Hannah Nathans worked for the Dutch government as a policymaker, trainer, and consultant (1970–1985). After several years as a senior consultant in a training and consulting firm, in 1989, she started her own business, Nathan's Consultancy. She was one of the first to introduce the enneagram in the Netherlands and later wrote a book about it. The enneagram is a system of nine personality types, strongly related to the kabbalistic tree of life.

In 2005, Nathans completed training as a Jewish Spiritual Director at Lev Shomea, Institute for Jewish Spiritual Direction. In 2007, Nathans' Consultancy became part of Rijnconsult, and Nathans founded HaMakor, Centre for Jewish Spirituality. Nathans earned a master in Hebrew language and culture at the University of Amsterdam. She studied to become a rabbi with Aleph Alliance for Jewish Renewal, a neo-hasidic movement founded by the late Rabbi Zalman Schachter-Shalomi, where she received her Semikha in January 2014.

Beginning in 2012, she worked as rabbi of the congregation Beit ha’Chidush (House of Renewal), affiliated with Liberal Judaism UK.

In 2016, she became the rabbi of the Open Jewish Congregation Klal Israel in Delft. Delft is a Reconstructionist community with an outreach orientation where everybody with Jewish ancestry or a deep longing for a Jewish life is welcome. For this congregation, Nathans gives giyur training. In 2017 she co-founded the Virtual European Minyan, which provides online services. The Virtual Minyan is intended to serve those who do not have access to Jewish services of their choice in their place of residence, but is open to all.

Works
 Adviseren als tweede beroep, resultaat bereiken als adviseur (1991/1995/2005/2015) (English: Consulting as second profession)
 Werken met het Enneagram, naar persoonlijk meesterschap en sociale intelligentie (Scriptum 2000) (English: The enneagram at work)
 Typisch ik, typisch jij; het enneagram, een handleiding bij mensen (Scriptum 2005) (English: Typically me, typically you; the enneagram a manual for people)
 Een wortel die alsem en gal voortbrengt; het 20e eeuwse Chassidisme van Shalom Noach Berezovsky  (2011) (English: A root oozing wormwood and gal; the 20th century Hasidism of Shalom Noach Berezovsky)
 Werkboek Adviseren als tweede beroep (Kluwer 2012, mede-auteurs Marijke Broekhuijsen, Catalina Auer, Paul Meijer) (English: Work book Consulting as second profession)
 Can someone in the process of conversion serve as shali’ach tzibbur? in R.Daniel Siegel, Renewing ger toshav; opening the gates that more may enter to praise God (2017)

References

1944 births
Converts to Reconstructionist Judaism
Dutch rabbis
Dutch women writers
Living people
Reconstructionist women rabbis
Women rabbis
Writers from Amsterdam